"Ready or Not" is a single by Lou Gramm from his debut solo album of the same name, Ready or Not, released in 1987.

Cash Box said that "Gramm is on firm ground with this new single that combines his urgent singing and punchy production."

Chart positions

References

1987 songs
1987 singles
Songs written by Lou Gramm
Song recordings produced by Pat Moran
Songs written by Bruce Turgon